Piglet may refer to:

Animals
 Piglet, the young offspring of the domestic pig
 Suckling pig, a farmed piglet raised on mother's milk and slaughtered for food
 Banded piglet squid (Helicocranchia pfefferi), a small squid species
 Moss piglet, or tardigrade, a microscopic water-dwelling animal

Literature
 Piglet (Winnie-the-Pooh), a character from A.A. Milne's Winnie-the-Pooh books and related media
 The piglets, characters from the novel Animal Farm

Music
 Piglet (band), an American math-rock band formed in 2005
 The Piglets, a 1970s British session band credited for songs by Jonathan King
 "Piglet", a 1998 song by Arab Strap from Philophobia

Other uses
 Piglet (gamer), Chae Gwang-jin, South Korean professional League of Legends player and coach
 "Piglets" (Teletubbies), a 1998 TV episode

See also
 Pig (disambiguation)